The 1909 Indiana Hoosiers football team was an American football team that represented Indiana University Bloomington during the 1909 college football season. In their fifth season under head coach James M. Sheldon, the Hoosiers compiled a 4–3 record, finished in a tie for fifth place in the Big Nine Conference, and were outscored by their opponents by a combined total of 129 to 53.

Schedule

References

Indiana
Indiana Hoosiers football seasons
Indiana Hoosiers football